The Lauchert is a river in Baden-Württemberg, Germany, left tributary of the Danube. Its source is near Sonnenbühl, in the Swabian Alb. It is approx. 60 km long. It flows generally south through the small towns Gammertingen, Veringenstadt and Bingen. It flows into the Danube in Sigmaringendorf.

References

Rivers of Baden-Württemberg
Rivers of Germany